Vorobyovo is a rural locality (a settlement) in Voykovsky Selsoviet, Shipunovsky District, Altai Krai, Russia. The population was 198 as of 2013. There are 4 streets.

Geography 
Vorobyovo is located 64 km southeast of Shipunovo (the district's administrative centre) by road. Kosobokovo is the nearest rural locality.

References 

Rural localities in Shipunovsky District